"A Bay Bay" is the debut single by American rapper Hurricane Chris, released on April 10, 2007. The song was produced by Phunk Dawg. It peaked at number 7 on the US Billboard Hot 100.

Commercial performance 
The song debuted at number 95 on the US Billboard Hot 100. In its second week, the song rose to number 85; in its third week, it rose 61 places to number 24. The song later peaked at number 7 on the chart. It peaked at number 3 on the New Zealand singles chart.

Music video 
The video was shot and filmed in Cedar Grove, showing local landmarks and featuring a crowd of people singing along to the song. The music video peaked at number one on BET's 106 & Park. Closing out the year, the music video peaked at number 3 on BET's Top 100 Videos of 2007.

Remixes 
The remix, titled "The Ratchet Remix", features guest vocals by fellow rappers The Game, Lil Boosie, E-40, Baby, Angie Locc and Jadakiss. In 2007, a music video was released for "A Bay Bay (The Ratchet Remix)". The two versions for two music videos were for the remix only. The short version were featuring all of these artists (included their verses), except for E-40. However, E-40 did make the cameo appearance, alongside Pitbull and Lil Jon. The extended version features E-40's full appearance, along with his verse that he did on the remix. Big Kuntry King made his own remix to the song. Sincero, Chingo Bling and Pitbull made their own remix version to the song, titled "'Aye Wey Wey".

Charts

Weekly charts

Year-end charts

In popular culture
In "Clarifications", the eighth episode of season five of The Wire, the characters Chris and Snoop listen to "A Bay Bay" while driving through Baltimore.

References

External links
Hurricane's Official Myspace
Hurricane Chris' Official YouTube channel

2007 debut singles
2007 songs
Hurricane Chris (rapper) songs
J Records singles
Crunk songs